In Greek mythology, Magnes (Ancient Greek: Μάγνης) was a Thessalian prince who later on became the eponymous first king of Magnesia.

Mythology 
Magnes was the son of Zeus and Thyia, daughter of Deucalion, and brother of Makednos. In the Bibliotheca, Magnes was placed in the later generation of the Deucalionides, for this time he was the son of Aeolus and Enarete and brother to Aeolian progenitors: Cretheus, Sisyphus, Athamas, Salmoneus, Deion, Perieres, Canace, Alcyone, Pisidice, Calyce and Perimede.

Magnes married an unnamed naiad that bore him Dictys and Polydectes. The mother and the sons later emigrated and colonized the island of Seriphos. Polydectes became king of the island while his brother Dictys, a fisherman would later receive Danae and her son Perseus.

The scholiast of Euripides called Magnes' wife as Philodice and his sons, Eurynomus and Eioneus. Otherwise, Eustathius named his wife as a certain Meliboea and mentioned one son, Alector, and added that Magnes called the town of Meliboea at the foot of mount Pelion after his wife and the country of Magnesia after his own name.

Pierus, the father of Hyacinth by the Muse Clio, was also called a son of Magnes. According to Tzetzes, the latter was also said to have fathered Linus by Clio.

Notes

References 

Apollodorus, The Library with an English Translation by Sir James George Frazer, F.B.A., F.R.S. in 2 Volumes, Cambridge, MA, Harvard University Press; London, William Heinemann Ltd. 1921. . Online version at the Perseus Digital Library. Greek text available from the same website.
Gaius Julius Hyginus, Astronomica from The Myths of Hyginus translated and edited by Mary Grant. University of Kansas Publications in Humanistic Studies. Online version at the Topos Text Project.
Hesiod, Catalogue of Women from Homeric Hymns, Epic Cycle, Homerica translated by Evelyn-White, H G. Loeb Classical Library Volume 57. London: William Heinemann, 1914. Online version at theio.com 
Pausanias, Description of Greece with an English Translation by W.H.S. Jones, Litt.D., and H.A. Ormerod, M.A., in 4 Volumes. Cambridge, MA, Harvard University Press; London, William Heinemann Ltd. 1918. . Online version at the Perseus Digital Library
Pausanias, Graeciae Descriptio. 3 vols. Leipzig, Teubner. 1903.  Greek text available at the Perseus Digital Library.
William Smith. A Dictionary of Greek and Roman Biography and Mythology. London (1873).

Princes in Greek mythology
Kings in Greek mythology
Children of Zeus
Demigods in classical mythology
Deucalionids
Aeolides
Thessalian characters in Greek mythology
Thessalian mythology